Chinese orange may refer to:

Citrus medica, fragrant citrus fruit
Poncirus trifoliata, member of the family Rutaceae, closely related to Citrus
Mandarin orange, small citrus tree with fruit resembling other oranges